Bruno da Silva Costa Leite (born 7 April 2000), known as Bruno Leite, is a Brazilian footballer who plays as a midfielder for Joinville, on loan from Athletico Paranaense.

Career statistics

Honours
Athletico Paranaense
Campeonato Paranaense: 2019, 2020

References

External links
Athletico Paranaense official profile 

2000 births
Living people
People from Maceió
Brazilian footballers
Association football midfielders
Campeonato Brasileiro Série A players
Campeonato Paranaense players
Club Athletico Paranaense players
Sportspeople from Alagoas